Methylonatrum is a genus of bacteria from the class of purple sulfur bacteria with one known species (Methylohalomonas lacus). Methylonatrum kenyense has been isolated from hypersaline lakes from the Kulunda Steppe in Russia.

References

Gammaproteobacteria
Bacteria genera
Monotypic bacteria genera